Borja Vivas Jiménez (born 26 May 1984) is a Spanish shot putter. He represented his country at the 2012 and 2016 Summer Olympics as well as four outdoor and three indoor World Championships, in addition to multiple regional competitions. His biggest success is the silver medal at the 2014 European Championships.

Achievements

External links

1984 births
Living people
Spanish male shot putters
Sportspeople from Málaga
Athletes (track and field) at the 2012 Summer Olympics
Athletes (track and field) at the 2016 Summer Olympics
Olympic athletes of Spain
World Athletics Championships athletes for Spain
European Athletics Championships medalists
Mediterranean Games gold medalists for Spain
Athletes (track and field) at the 2013 Mediterranean Games
Mediterranean Games medalists in athletics
Athletes (track and field) at the 2018 Mediterranean Games
20th-century Spanish people
21st-century Spanish people